The Marines' Memorial Club in San Francisco, California at 609 Sutter Street (at Mason), is a 501(c)19 nonprofit veterans charity and private social club for United States Marines and other veterans of the United States Armed Forces. The nonprofit Marines' Memorial Association owns the large building in the Union Square neighborhood of San Francisco that houses a hotel, theater, restaurant/bar, sports club, special event facilities, library, museum, memorial, and a military history bookstore. The facility was built as the Western Women's Club in 1926.

History
As a port city, San Francisco has, since its founding by Spain, been associated with military personnel – especially the navy – and merchant mariners. During World War II it was a point of embarcation for many sailors in the Pacific, who would keep fond memories of their few days in the city before leaving for the war.

The Marines' Memorial was opened as a club for veterans of the Marines, although membership is open to all United States servicemembers. Early in 1946, the Commandant of the Marine Corps, General Alexander A. Vandegrift, had proposed a "living memorial" to Marine casualties from the War in the Pacific. A group of Marines arranged to buy a building owned by a women's club at Mason Street and Sutter Street in San Francisco, whose members they had met through their participation in the wartime WAVES program. The club opened on November 10, 1946, the anniversary of the founding of the Marine Corps.

The theater predates the club, and was part of the original 1926 building. In its early days it hosted nationwide radio broadcasts by Bob Hope, Jack Benny, and Frank Sinatra. It later housed the San Francisco Actor's Workshop, which produced plays by Arthur Miller, Tennessee Williams, and Bertolt Brecht. It was also the first home of the American Conservatory Theater.

Today the association has 21,000 members from all branches of the United States military, NOAA, and the Public Health Service, mostly from California.

Features
The Marines' Memorial is housed in a 12-story Spanish Colonial-style building built in 1926 as the "Western Women's Club", a member of the General Federation of Women's Clubs. It was bought by the association in 1946. The most noticeable features are a 650-seat repertory theater and a lobby display of military memorabilia, most notably the ship's bell from the USS San Francisco. It also includes two restaurants (including the club's "Leatherneck Grill" steakhouse) and a Club One fitness center. The building also includes the Tribute Memorial Wall, a private memorial to American troops killed in the Iraq War and war in Afghanistan.

See also
 List of American gentlemen's clubs

References

External links

Official theater website

Clubs and societies in California
Buildings and structures in San Francisco
Union Square, San Francisco
Clubhouses in California
Theatres in San Francisco
Gentlemen's clubs in California
Culture of San Francisco
Organizations based in San Francisco
Organizations associated with the United States Marine Corps